Paul Gordon Jarvis (1935 - 2013)  was a leading ecologist and Professor of Forestry and Natural Resources at the University of Edinburgh from 1975 to 2001.

Education
Jarvis was educated at Oriel College, Oxford graduating with a Bachelor of Arts degree in Botany. He went to graduate school at the University of Sheffield where he was awarded a PhD in 1960 for research on the growth and regeneration of Irish oak Quercus petraea. Funded by a NATO scholarship, he moved to Uppsala University where he was awarded a second doctorate in plant physiology in 1963.

Career and research
In 1964 he moved to Australia, where he did postdoctoral research at the Commonwealth Scientific and Industrial Research Organisation (CSIRO). He returned to the United Kingdom in 1966, where he worked at the University of Aberdeen for nine years until 1975, and then at the University of Edinburgh for twenty six years where he was a Professor until his retirement in 2001.

Jarvis research interests were in plant ecology and plant physiology. He demonstrated the link between forests and the atmosphere using novel techniques for measuring leaf water potential and stomatal conductance. He is the author, co-author or editor of several textbooks and monographs including The carbon balance of forest biomes with Howard Griffiths.

Awards and honours
Jarvis was elected a Fellow of the Royal Society (FRS) in 1997. His certificate of election reads: 

In 1978, Jarvis was a founding member of the influential peer reviewed scientific journal Plant, Cell & Environment with David Jennings a mycologist at the University of Liverpool; John Raven, a botanist at the University of Dundee; Harry Smith at the University of Nottingham and the publisher Bob Campbell at Blackwell Scientific publications.  He served on the editorial board of Photosynthetica, was the President of  the Society for Experimental Biology and a Commissioner of the Countryside Commission for Scotland. He was also an elected Fellow of the Royal Society of Edinburgh in 1979, the Royal Swedish Academy of Agriculture and Forestry, the Institute of Chartered Foresters and the Institute of Biology.

Personal life
Jarvis met his wife Margaret while they were both undergraduates at Oxford, they had three children.

References

1935 births
2013 deaths
Fellows of the Royal Society
Fellows of the Royal Society of Edinburgh
British ecologists
Alumni of Oriel College, Oxford
Alumni of the University of Sheffield
Members of the Royal Swedish Academy of Agriculture and Forestry